Vice Admiral Pradeep Chatterjee, PVSM, AVSM, NM, ADC is a former Flag Officer in the Indian Navy officer. He served as Deputy Chief of Naval Staff of the Indian Navy from 29 May 2012 to 31 May 2014 before serving as Commander-in-Chief, Andaman and Nicobar Command.

Military career
He joined the Indian Navy in July 1977, qualifying as a submariner. He commanded the submarines INS Shankush and INS Shankul.

He later served as Commodore Commanding Submarines (West) in Mumbai, and Principal Director Submarine Operations at Naval Headquarters. On reaching flag rank he served as Flag Officer Submarines, Flag Officer Maharashtra and Gujarat Naval Area and Inspector General Nuclear Safety before his assignment as Deputy Chief of Naval Staff.

He retired in 2016.

Honours and awards
He has been awarded the Param Vishisht Seva Medal, Ati Vishisht Seva Medal, Yudh Seva Medal (YSM) and Nao Sena Medal.

References

Living people
Indian Navy admirals
Deputy Chiefs of Naval Staff (India)
Recipients of the Ati Vishisht Seva Medal
Recipients of the Param Vishisht Seva Medal
Submariners
Flag Officers Submarines (India)
Year of birth missing (living people)
Commanders-in-Chief, Andaman and Nicobar Command
Recipients of the Nau Sena Medal